The 1939 French Championships (now known as the French Open) was a tennis tournament that took place on the outdoor clay courts at the Stade Roland-Garros in Paris, France. The tournament ran from 8 June until 17 June. It was the 44th staging of the French Championships and the last one held before a six-year hiatus due to World War II. It was the second of four Grand Slam tennis events of the year.

Finals

Men's singles

 Don McNeill defeated  Bobby Riggs  7–5, 6–0, 6–3

Women's singles

 Simonne Mathieu defeated  Jadwiga Jędrzejowska 6–3, 8–6

Men's doubles
 Don McNeill /  Charles Harris defeated  Jean Borotra /  Jacques Brugnon  4–6, 6–4, 6–0, 2–6, 10–8

Women's doubles
 Simonne Mathieu  /  Jadwiga Jędrzejowska defeated  Alice Florian /  Hella Kovac 7–5, 7–5

Mixed doubles
 Sarah Palfrey /  Elwood Cooke defeated  Simonne Mathieu  /  Franjo Kukuljević  4–6, 6–1, 7–5

References

External links
 French Open official website

French Championships
French Championships (tennis) by year
French Championships (tennis)
French Championships (tennis)
French Championships (tennis)